

The Chyeranovskii BICh-16 (or sometimes Cheranovsky BICh-16) is an experimental Soviet man-powered ornithopter designed and built by Boris Ivanovich Cheranovsky. The BiCH-16 was a wooden construction tailless design with a braced skid landing gear and the wings moved by pedals. It was first flown by R.A. Pischuchev as a glider after launch by cable but it was unstable and re-built a number of times before being abandoned in 1938.

References

Notes

Bibliography

 

1930s Soviet experimental aircraft
BiCH-16
Ornithopters
Human-powered aircraft